The 2014–15 Azadegan League was the 24th season of the Azadegan League and 14th as the second highest division since its establishment in 1991. The season featured 16 teams from the 2013–14 Azadegan League, three new teams relegated from the 2013–14 Persian Gulf Cup: Fajr Sepasi, Damash and Mes Kerman and four new teams promoted from the 2013–14 2nd Division: Shahrdari Ardabil and Etka Gorgan both as champions and Foolad Novin and Shahrdari Tabriz. Tarbiat Yazd replaced Yazd Louleh. The league started on 4 October 2014 and ended on 22 April 2015. Foolad Novin won the Azadegan League title for the first time in their history. Siah Jamegan and Esteghlal Ahvaz promoted to the Persian Gulf Pro League.

Start of season
The league is feature to three teams relegated from Iran Pro League in 2013–14; Mes Kerman, Fajr Sepasi and Damash Gilan.
It featured four teams promoted from 2013–14 2nd Division: Shahrdari Ardabil, Etka Gorgan, Foolad Novin , and Shahrdari Tabriz.

Changes
Two fewer teams participate in the 2014–15 Azadegan League, compared to the previous year.

Teams

Group A

Group B

Standings

Group A

Group B

Azadegan League play-off 

Mes Kerman as 2nd-placed team of Group A will faced Mes Rafsanjan as 2nd-placed team of Group B in a two-legged Play-off.

Mes Kerman won 1–0 on aggregate and receives its place in the relegation Play-off of the Persian Gulf Pro League.

Relegation play-off (Persian Gulf Pro League)

Esteghlal Khuzestan as 14th-placed team will faced Play-off winner of 2014–15 Azadegan League, Mes Kerman in a two-legged Play-off.

Esteghlal Khuzestan won 3–0 on aggregate and retained its place in the next edition of the Persian Gulf Pro League.

Relegation play-off (Azadegan League) 

Esteghlal Ahvaz as 9th-placed team of Group A will faced Shahrdari Tabriz as 9th-placed team of Group B in a two-legged Play-off.

3–3 on aggregate. Shahrdari Tabriz won on away goals.

Final

Siah Jamegan as winner of Group A will faced Foolad Novin as winner of Group B in a final.

Foolad Novin become champions of the league for the first time in their history.

References

Azadegan League seasons
Iran
2014–15 in Iranian football leagues